Salentin VI of Isenburg-Neumagen was the Count of Isenburg-Neumagen from 1502 until 1534.

House of Isenburg